The Bezirksoberliga Schwaben was the seventh tier of the German football league system in the Bavarian Regierungsbezirk of Swabia. Until the introduction of the 3. Liga in 2008 it was the sixth tier of the league system, until the introduction of the Regionalligas in 1994 the fifth tier.

The league was disbanded at the end of the 2011–12 season, when major changes to the Bavarian football league system were carried out. Above the Bezirksoberligas, the Landesligas were expanded in number from three to five divisions and the Bezirke have two to three regional leagues, the Bezirksligas, as its highest level again, similar to the system in place until 1988.

Overview 
The Bezirksoberligas in Bavaria were introduced in 1988 upon the suggestion of the 1. FC Sonthofen in 1986, to create a highest single-division playing level for each of the seven Regierungsbezirke. The term Bezirksoberliga translates roughly into County Premier League, a Regierungsbezirk being a similar administrative entity to a County. 

Before the introduction of the Bezirksoberligas, the Bezirksliga was the level of play below the Landesliga. The Bezirksliga Schwaben-Nord and Schwaben-Süd fed the Landesliga Bayern-Süd as they afterwards feed the Bezirksoberliga Schwaben. From 1963 to 1968 there was only one common Bezirksliga in Schwaben, similar to what the Bezirksoberliga does now. From 1968 onwards the Bezirksligas were always split.

The winner of the Bezirksoberliga Schwaben, like the winner of the Bezirksoberliga Oberbayern, was directly promoted to the Landesliga Bayern-Süd. The two second placed teams out of those league's played-off for another promotion spot. The winner went to Landesliga, the loser faced the 15th placed team out of the Landesliga for the last spot there. However, in some years additional promotion places were available in the Landesliga. In 1994, 2000 and 2004, three teams from Schwaben gained promotion to the Landesliga.

The three bottom teams of the Bezirksoberliga were relegated to the Bezirksliga, the team just above those faced a play-off against the second placed Bezirksliga teams.

The area covered by the Schwaben FA is not identical to the Bezirk Schwaben, mainly because that the Bezirks borders, like everywhere in Bavaria, were altered in the 1970s in a border reform. Therefore, there are quite a few clubs playing in Schwaben that are actually at home in Oberbayern. The TSV Landsberg and the FC Pipinsried are the most successful of those but others have made it into the Bezirksoberliga too. Also, some clubs from western Schwaben are playing in the Baden-Württemberg football league system. These are called the Iller Vereine after the river Iller that forms the border in this area. These mostly left the Schwaben FA in 1946, but some, like the SpVgg Lindau, have always played in Württemberg.

Another oddity is the club SV Casino Kleinwalsertal, playing in the Schwaben but being at home in Austria. The Kleinwalsertal can only be accessed by land via Germany.

The Schwaben Cup, one of the seven now defunct Bezirkspokale (Cups), featured another oddity. It heavily favours low-level clubs. A lower-level club always had home advantage to the higher one and also only need a draw to advance. In 1994 the SC Altenmünster and in 1998 the BC Aichach both won the cup against higher classed Bayernliga club FC Memmingen by drawing after extra time. The rule was changed for the cup-final game after 1998.

The region of Schwaben is actually much larger than the Bavarian region of Schwaben, it compromises all of the state of Baden-Württemberg and event relates linguistically into Austria and Switzerland. In football however, the only region that carries the name is the Bavarian region of Schwaben.

With the league reform at the end of the 2011–12 season, which includes an expansion of the number of Landesligas from three to five, the Bezirksoberligas were disbanded. Instead, the Bezirksligas took the place of the Bezirksoberligas below the Landesligas once more.

The clubs from the Bezirksoberliga joined the following leagues:
 Champions: Promotion round to the Bayernliga, winners to the Bayernliga, losers to the Landesliga.
 Teams placed 2nd to 6th: Directly qualified to the Landesliga.
 Teams placed 7th to 10th: Three additional Landesliga places to be determined in a play-off round with the Bezirksliga champions, losers enter Bezirksliga.
 Teams placed 11th to 16th: Directly relegated to Bezirksligas

Top-three of the Bezirksoberliga
The top-three finishers in the league since its interception:

 Promoted teams in bold.
 + Teams finished on equal points, decider needed to determine final position.

Multiple winners
The following clubs have won the league more than once:

League placings
The final placings in the league since its interception:

Key

 S = No of seasons in league (as of 2011-12)

Notes
 1 The FC Augsburg II withdrew from the league in 1989.
 2 The FC Enikon Augsburg withdrew from the Oberliga in 1995.

All-time table 1988–2012
The SpVgg Kaufbeuren leads the all-time table of this league with 1,061 points, 326 points ahead of the TSV 1861 Nördlingen, third placed is the TSV Kottern. The SV Klingsmoos holds the 71st and last place with 16 points. The SpVgg Kaufbeuren has spent 22 out of a possible 24 seasons in the Bezirksoberliga, only interrupted by two one-year stints in the Landesliga. For the 2011–12 season, the last of the league, three clubs joined it that have never before played in it, the TSV Dinkelscherben, SV Mering and SV Egg an der Günz.

References

Sources
 Die Bayernliga 1945 - 1997,  published by the DSFS, 1998
 50 Jahre Bayrischer Fussball-Verband  50-year-anniversary book of the Bavarian FA, publisher: Vindelica Verlag, published: 1996
 Das Fussball Jahresjournal  Annual end-of-season magazine of the Swabian FA

External links 
 Bayrischer Fussball Verband (Bavarian FA) 
 Schwaben branch of the Bavarian FA  
 Das deutsche Fussball Archiv  Historic German league tables
 Bavarian League tables and results  
 Website with tables and results from the Bavarian Oberliga to Bezirksliga  

Defunct football leagues in Bavaria
Football leagues in Swabia
1988 establishments in West Germany
2012 disestablishments in Germany
Schwaben
Sports leagues established in 1988